Horton Creek may refer to:

Horton Creek (Arizona)
Horton Creek (Oxbow Creek), in Pennsylvania
Horton Creek (Tunkhannock Creek), in Pennsylvania